Baek Seo-yi (born August 3, 1992) is a South Korean actress.

Career
Baek signed with new agency Cube Entertainment.

Filmography

Film

Television series

Music videos appearances

Awards and nominations

References

External links

  
 
 

Living people
1992 births
21st-century South Korean actresses
South Korean film actresses
South Korean television actresses
Konkuk University alumni
Actresses from Seoul
Cube Entertainment artists